Pandora Hearts is an anime television series adaptation based on the manga series of the same name by written and illustrated by Jun Mochizuki. It is directed by Takao Kato under the studio XEBEC.  The series debuted on April 2, 2009 through the Japanese TV networks TBS and BS-TBS. The series uses four theme songs: one opening song, two ending songs, and one insert song.  The opening theme is "Parallel Hearts" by FictionJunction, and the ending themes are "Maze" by Savage Genius feat. Tomoe Ohmi and "Watashi wo Mitsukete" by Savage Genius.  The insert song "Every Time You Kissed Me" performed by Emily Bindiger is used in the last episode.

Episode listing

References

External links

TBS Anime official website 
Xebec Anime official webpage 

Pandora Hearts